Pat Meyers (born May 8, 1954) is an American professional golfer who played on the LPGA Tour.

Meyers won once on the LPGA Tour in 1979.

Professional wins

LPGA Tour wins (1)

LPGA Tour playoff record (0–1)

References

External links

American female golfers
LPGA Tour golfers
People from Ormond Beach, Florida
1954 births
Living people
21st-century American women